Arivarasu Kalainesan, more commonly known as Arivu, is an Indian rapper, lyricist, and playback singer who works in Tamil language films. He is best known for the song "Vaathi Raid" from Master (2021) and for his single "Enjoy Enjaami".

Early life 
Arivu was brought up in Arakkonam, a town 60 kilometres west of Chennai. He was exposed to many folk songs as he grew up in family without TV and radio, as his parents wanted him to concentrate on school. He started to write poems about caste and poverty in his high school days and became more politically conscious during his college.

Career 
While pursuing his MBA in college, Arivu met Pa. Ranjith who signed him to be part of Kaala (2018). Arivu had later auditioned and landed a role in Ranjith's band The Casteless Collective. He has since made several independent songs in addition to composing songs for Tamil-language films. Arivu teamed with music producer OfRo to create the album Therukural (Voice of street), which became popular upon release. After many film song hits, he teamed up with Dhee and Santhosh Narayanan as music producer under label Maajja, an independent platform launched by Indian producer A. R. Rahman and released the single Enjoy Enjaami in March 2021, the song and its music video received viral response, it has crossed 400 million views on YouTube as of April 2022.

Discography

Singles

Albums 

 Therukural (2019)

Films

Television

References

External links 

Indian rappers
Indian lyricists
Tamil playback singers
Tamil film poets
Tamil rappers
Tamil-language lyricists
Tamil poets
Indian male singer-songwriters
Indian singer-songwriters
Indian male artists